Koço Qendro (born 15 May 1927) is an Albanian actor of film, stage and theater.

Filmography 
 Tre ditë nga një jetë - (1986)
 Vendimi - (1984) Aleks Xinxa
 Agimet e stinës së madhe - (1981) Aleks Lili
 Përballimi - (1976) Shefedini
 I teti ne bronz - (1970) Ballisti

References 

20th-century Albanian male actors
People from Delvinë
1927 births
Living people